Mary Garner may refer to:
 Mary Texas Hurt Garner, politician from Alabama
 Mary Field Garner, member of the Church of Jesus Christ of Latter-day Saints and Mormon pioneer
 USS Mary B. Garner (SP-682), a United States Navy minesweeper